Willie Martinez is an American football coach who is currently the Cornerbacks coach for the University of Tennessee.  A graduate of the University of Miami, Martinez was formerly defensive coordinator and secondary coach of the Georgia Bulldogs football team, initially working as the secondary coach from 2001 to 2005 before being promoted to defensive coordinator.  He was fired following the 2009 season.

Martinez served as the defensive backs coach for the Oklahoma Sooners football team from 2010 to January 2012, when he resigned. On February 13, 2012, Martinez was hired to coach defensive backs for Auburn University.  The move reunited him with Auburn's Defensive Coordinator Brian VanGorder.  The two had coached together for several years at Central Florida, Central Michigan, and the University of Georgia. In December 2012, Martinez joined Butch Jones's staff at Tennessee until January 2017, then in 2020 when Tennessee fired their Head Coach Jeremy Pruitt, Tennessee hired Josh Heupel and Heupel then hired Martinez to his staff.

References

External links
 UCF profile

1963 births
Living people
American football defensive backs
Bethune–Cookman Wildcats football coaches
Central Michigan Chippewas football coaches
Cincinnati Bearcats football coaches
Eastern Michigan Eagles football coaches
Georgia Bulldogs football coaches
Miami Hurricanes football players
Oklahoma Sooners football coaches
UCF Knights football coaches
Tennessee Volunteers football coaches
High school football coaches in Florida
Players of American football from Miami
Sports coaches from Miami
Coaches of American football from Florida